= Echo de Varsovie =

l'Echo de Varsovie
- Cover of Echo de Varsovie, 1938
- Type: Biweekly newspaper
- Editor: Lucien Roquigny
- Founded: 1930
- Language: French language
- Headquarters: Warsaw, Poland

Echo de Varsovie ('Echo of Warsaw') was a French language biweekly newspaper published from Warsaw. The newspaper was founded in 1930. As of 1937, its director was Lucien Roquigny.
